Noordscheschut is a village in the north of the Netherlands. It is located in the municipality of Hoogeveen, Drenthe.

History
Noordscheschut is a settlement along a canal which developed in the 18th century for peat excavation. It was first mentioned in the 1850s as Noordsche Schut, and means "northern sluice".

In 2020, the local football club, VV Noordscheschut, promoted to the Hoofdklasse.

References

Hoogeveen
Populated places in Drenthe